The 1955–56 Rugby Football League season was the leagues's 61st season.

Season summary
Belle Vue Rangers dropped out of the competition shortly before the start of the season. There was no time to reschedule and so percentages were used.

In 1955-56 Wigan took part in the Independent Television Association Trophy. This was a series of televised floodlit matches played in London and shown on the newly launched ITV. It only lasted one year but the idea would be picked up again by the BBC in 1965.

ITV Floodlit Competition winners were Warrington who beat Leigh 43-18 in the final.

Hull F.C. won their fourth Rugby Football League Championship when they beat Halifax 10-9 in the play-off final.  Warrington had finished the regular season as league leaders.

The Challenge Cup winners were St. Helens who beat Halifax 13-2 in the final.

Warrington won the Lancashire League, and Halifax won the Yorkshire League. Leigh beat Widnes 26–9 to win the Lancashire County Cup, and Halifax beat Hull F.C. 10–10 (replay 7–0) to win the Yorkshire County Cup.

Championship

Play-offs

Challenge Cup

In the Challenge Cup tournament's final St. Helens faced Halifax. Played on 28 April 1956 at Wembley Stadium in front of a crowd of 79,341, St Helens won 13-2.  This was Saints' first Challenge Cup final win in five Final appearances. Alan Prescott, their prop forward was awarded the Lance Todd Trophy for man-of-the-match.

The St Helens team was greeted enthusiastically upon their return to the North. After detraining at Liverpool the team's open-top coach ride to St Helens attracted an estimated 100,000 people despite pouring rain.

European Championship

This was the fifteenth European Championship and was won for the second time by the Other Nationalities.

Results

Final standings

References

Sources
1955-56 Rugby Football League season at Wigan.rlfans.com
The Challenge Cup at The Rugby Football League website

1955 in English rugby league
1956 in English rugby league
Northern Rugby Football League seasons